Heterogeneity is a diverseness of constituent structure.

Heterogeneity or heterogeneous may also refer to:

Data analysis
 Heterogeneity in statistics
 Heterogeneity in economics
 Study heterogeneity, a concept in statistics
 Heterogeneous relation

Biology and medicine
 Heterogeneous conditions in medicine are those conditions which have several causes/etiologies
 A heterogeneous taxon, a taxon that contains a great variety of individuals or sub-taxa; usually this implies that the taxon is an artificial grouping
 Genetic heterogeneity, multiple origins causing the same disorder in different individuals.
 Allelic heterogeneity, different mutations at the same locus causing the same disorder.

Chemistry
A heterogeneous reaction, a reaction in chemical kinetics that takes place at the interface of two or more phases, i.e. between a solid and a gas, a liquid and a gas, or a solid and a liquid
A heterogeneous catalysis, one in which the catalyst is in a different phase from the substrate

Ecology
 Heterogeneity in landscape ecology, the measure of how different parts of a landscape are from one another.

Computer science
 Heterogeneous computing, electronic systems that utilize a variety of different types of computational units
 Semantic heterogeneity, where there are differences in meaning and interpretation across data sources and datasets
 A data resource with multiple types of formats.

See also
Homogeneity and heterogeneity
Homogeneity (disambiguation)
 Degeneracy